The Great Falls Portage is the route taken by the Lewis and Clark Expedition in 1805 to portage around the Great Falls of the Missouri River during the outbound portion of the expedition.  The  portage took 31 days.  Two portions of the route, which have largely escaped development, are part of a National Historic Landmark District, designated in 1966 to commemorate this achievement.  In May 2008 the National Trust for Historic Preservation listed the site on their list of America's Most Endangered Places.

History
The 1804–1806 Lewis and Clark Expedition was the first major incursion of English-speaking white men into the northwestern American plains.  Ascending the Missouri River, the party reached the Great Falls area on June 13, 1805.  Having been forewarned of the falls' existence by the Hidatsa with whom they had overwintered, an advance team led by Meriwether Lewis scouted the extent of the falls, which then consisted of a series of cascades extending beyond what is now the city of Great Falls.  Many of these have since been dammed to produce hydroelectric power, and some are hemmed in by the city.

The route selected by Clark began with an ascent of over  up what is now called Belt Creek, about 1 mile below present-day Morony Dam.  From there, the expedition boats were carried overland on crude wagons constructed by the team overland to a site near the White Bear Islands, south of the modern city. The expedition's largest boat, a pirogue, was left at Belt Creek.  The team celebrated Independence Day at the upper camp, and departed upstream on July 15, having constructed two additional canoes to compensate for the loss of the boat.

Landmarked areas

Two separate portions of the expedition portage route form part of the National Historic Landmark District designated in 1966. Also included in this section is Sulphur Spring, located above the west bank of the river opposite the mouth of Belt Creek. Water from this source, reputed to have curative powers, was used to treat Sacagawea, who had fallen seriously ill at the camp. This entire area is privately owned, and is difficult to access by land.

The other element of the portage that is landmarked is the last  of the route, extending from Mount Olivet Cemetery to the White Bear Islands area (approximately ).  At the time of the expedition there were three White Bear Islands; one has since become attached to the western shore by silting action, and the actual camp site was probably some way east of the current eastern bank.  The land in this area is also privately owned but is crossed by public roads.

See also
National Register of Historic Places listings in Cascade County, Montana
List of National Historic Landmarks in Montana

References

National Historic Landmarks in Montana
Geography of Cascade County, Montana
Historic trails and roads in Montana
Historic districts on the National Register of Historic Places in Montana
National Register of Historic Places in Cascade County, Montana
Portages on the National Register of Historic Places
Lewis and Clark Expedition
Missouri River